A Day at the Bay is the debut album by the Australian rock band Tlot Tlot and their first release under that name. It was released in 1991. It was only released on cassette.

Angie Hart from Frente sings on "Marshall".

"Marshall" was later retitled "Under the Water" and completely rerecorded with Merril Bainbridge on vocals, appearing on her debut album The Garden in 1995 and being released as a single.

On Owen Bolwell's website Bubblerr, he mentions that the album was recorded concurrently with Frente's debut EP Whirled.

Track listing 
 Cancer
 Dog
 Once or Twice
 The Bonebass Suttee
 Love Potion Number Nine
 Marshall
 Bella
 Judas
 Screaming Lovers
 Bus
 Settle
 Red Shoes
 Birthday
 Victor

All songs except tracks 5, 6, 10, 11, 13 and 14 were rereleased on Pistolbuttsa'twinkle in 1992. Track 5 was released as a B-side to the "Old Mac" single in 1992, while tracks 6, 10, 11, 13 and 14 were rereleased on Pistolbuttsatwinkle'atwinkle in 1993. All tracks were remixed, overdubbed and remastered for the CD releases.

Crew 
 Stanley Paulzen - lead vocals, guitars
 Owen Bolwell - backing vocals, processed vocals, guitars, bass, drum programming, special effects, keyboards, lead vocals on track 2
 Aka Setkya - producer
 Greg Fields, Colin Mac - saxophones
 Angie Hart - lead vocals on track 6

1991 debut albums
Tlot Tlot albums